Indotyphlops jerdoni, or Jerdon's worm snake, is a species of harmless blind snake in the family Typhlopidae. The species is endemic to India. There are no subspecies which are recognized as being valid.

Etymology
The specific name, jerdoni, is in honor of British biologist Thomas C. Jerdon.

Geographic range
Indotyphlops jerdoni is found in eastern and northern India in Sikkim, northern West Bengal, Seven Sisters [Assam], and Meghalaya. Possibly, it also occurs in Bangladesh and Myanmar (Pegu).

The type locality given is "Khási Hills".

Reproduction
Indotyphlops jerdoni is oviparous.

References

Further reading

 Annandale N (1912). "Zoological results of the Abor Expedition, 1911-1912". Rec. Indian Mus., Calcutta 8 (1): 7-59 [Reptilia, pages 37–59]. (supplement in same journal, 8 (4): 357-358, 1914).
 Boulenger GA (1890). The Fauna of British India, Including Ceylon and Burma. Reptilia and Batrachia. London: Secretary of State for India in Council. (Taylor & Francis, printers). xviii + 541 pp. (Typhlops jerdoni, new species, p. 238).
 Das I (2002). A Photographic Guide to Snakes and other Reptiles of India. Sanibel Island, Florida: Ralph Curtis Books. 144 pp. . (Typhlops jerdoni, p. 58).
 Hedges SB, Marion AB, Lipp KM, Marin J, Vidal N (2014). "A taxonomic framework for typhlopid snakes from the Caribbean and other regions (Reptilia, Squamata)". Caribbean Herpetology (49): 1-61. (Indotyphlops jerdoni, new combination).
 Smith MA (1943). The Fauna of British India, Ceylon and Burma, Including the Whole of the Indo-Chinese Sub-region. Reptilia and Amphibia. Vol. III.—Serpentes. London: Secretary of State for India. (Taylor and Francis, printers). xii + 583 pp. (Typhlops jerdoni, p. 50).

External links
 

jerdoni
Taxa named by George Albert Boulenger
Reptiles described in 1890